Sha'ar HaAmakim (lit. Gate of the Valleys) is a kibbutz in northern Israel associated with the Hashomer Hatzair movement founded in 1935. Located near Kiryat Tiv'on, it falls under the jurisdiction of Zevulun Regional Council.

History

Antiquity

Human habitation in the area dates at least as far back as the Hellenistic period. Although the site, in recent history, has borne the name of Ḫirbet el-Ḥârithîye, it is thought by modern-day archaeologists to have been the Second Temple-period site known as Geba / Gibea, based on Josephus' description of distances between Geba and Simonias and Beit She'arim (Roman-era Jewish village) in Lower Galilee.

Crusades
In 1283, during the hudna ("truce") between the Crusaders  based in Acre and the Mamluk sultan al-Mansur Qalawun, this location was named el Harathiyah and was described as part of the domain of the Crusaders.

Ottoman rule
During the Ottoman era, a Muslim village at the site was named el Hâritheh.  The village appeared as El Harti  on the map of Pierre Jacotin compiled in 1799. In 1859, the population was recorded as 120 with tillable land of 12 feddans.  In 1875, Victor Guérin reported about 40 houses.  In 1882, the Palestine Exploration Fund's Survey of Western Palestine described it  as an adobe hamlet.

A population list from about 1887 showed that Harithiyeh had about 120  inhabitants; all Muslims.

British Mandate

In the 1922 census of Palestine, conducted by the  British Mandate authorities,  the Al Zubaidat, who cultivated the Hartieh land, numbered  363,  all Muslims.

The area was acquired by the Jewish community as part of the Sursock Purchase. In 1925 a Zionist organisation purchased 50 feddans in Hartieh  from the Sursock family of Beirut. At the time, there were 60 families living there. In the 1931 census, the Arab Zubeidat was counted under the Shefa-'Amr suburbs.

From 1931, and lasting several years, the Jewish Agency struggled to evict the Arab El Zubeidat, who were tenant farmers at Hartiya. According to Avneri,  Hartiya land was to become Sha'ar HaAmakim.
According to the Department of Statistics, however, Sha'ar HaAmakim had previously been part of Sheikh Bureik.

Kibbutz Sha'ar HaAmakim was founded in 1935 by immigrants from Romania and Yugoslavia. One of its founders was Aharon Cohen, later to be convicted of spying for the Soviet Union. Its name was derived from the nearby confluence of the Jezreel and Zevulun valleys. By the 1945 statistics  it had a population of 360, all Jews.

State of Israel
Sha'ar HaAmakim hosted volunteers from around the world, including France and the United States, who worked at the kibbutz and participated in cultural exchanges. In the 1960s, there were up to 100 volunteers each year. Bernie Sanders spent time at the kibbutz for several months in 1963.

Economy
According to a 2016 report, the kibbutz derives most of its income from its solar water heater factory. Additional sources of income include agriculture, such as dairy farming. For over five decades, the kibbutz has produced and processed sunflower seeds which it markets under its name both in Israel and for export. It also has a fish pond and orchards producing apples, peaches, and pears.

References

Bibliography

  
 

 

 
 
 
 (reprinted from 1944 edition)

External links 

 
Survey of Western Palestine, Map 5:  IAA, Wikimedia commons
Kibbutz Sha'ar HaAmakim Collection (in Hebrew) on the Digital collections of Younes and Soraya Nazarian Library, University of Haifa

Kibbutzim
Kibbutz Movement
Populated places established in 1935
Populated places in Haifa District
Romanian-Jewish culture in Israel
1935 establishments in Mandatory Palestine
Yugoslav-Jewish culture in Israel